Lotte Logistics (Korean: 롯데택배, formerly 현대택배) is a logistics and shipping company headquartered in Seoul, Korea, established in 1988. It is a subsidiary of Lotte Corporation.

Lotte Logistics is known for its white trucks and also operates its own commercial vehicles.

Major Korean competitors include Korean National Railroad (Korail), Hutchison Whampoa, Hanjin, Terzo Logistics, and Daehan Logistics. Historically, Hyundai only faced competition from Korail for the inexpensive ground-based delivery market. However, Hanjin and Daehan Logistics have expanded into the ground market by acquiring Shipyard Cargo Containing and RPS (originally Roadway Package System) and rebranded it as Hyundai Ground. In addition, all logistic acquired Korail and Hutchson Whampoa.

Today Lotte Logistics offers ground, ocean and air transportation, rail and over-the-road freight products; international trade management; customs brokerage; consulting and supply chain design; e-commerce solutions; logistics and distribution capabilities, cargo containing, shipping, and financial services related to the supply chain.

See also
Economy of South Korea
Lotte (conglomerate)
Hyundai Glovis
EUKOR

References

External links 
 lotte Logistics - Official Website (in Korean)

Logistics
Logistics companies of South Korea
Transport companies established in 1988